Eulimella tydemani is a species of sea snail, a marine gastropod mollusk in the family Pyramidellidae, the pyrams and their allies.

Distribution
This species occurs in the following locations:
 Cape Verde

References

tydemani
Gastropods described in 1998
Gastropods of Cape Verde